In the United States, the term hyphenated American refers to the use of a hyphen (in some styles of writing) between the name of an ethnicity and the word  in compound nouns, e.g., as in .  Calling a person a "hyphenated American" was used as an insult alleging divided political or national loyalties, especially in times of war. It was used from 1890 to 1920 to disparage Americans who were of foreign birth or ancestry and who displayed an affection for their ancestral language and/or culture. It was most commonly used during World War I against Americans from White ethnic backgrounds who favored United States neutrality during the ongoing conflict or who opposed the idea of an American alliance with the British Empire and the creation of what is now called the Special Relationship, even for purely political reasons.

In this context, the term "the hyphen" was a metonymical reference to this kind of ethnicity descriptor, and "dropping the hyphen" referred to full integration into the American identity.

Presidents Theodore Roosevelt and Woodrow Wilson were outspoken anti-hyphenates. Contemporary studies and debates refer to Hyphenated-American identities to discuss issues such as multiculturalism and immigration in the U.S. political climate; however, the term "hyphen" is rarely used per the recommendation of modern style guides.

Hyphenated Americanism, 1890–1920 

The term "hyphenated American" was published by 1889, and was common as a derogatory term by 1904. During World War I, the issue arose of the primary political loyalty of ethnic groups with close ties to Europe, especially German Americans. In 1915, former U.S. President Theodore Roosevelt in speaking to the largely Irish Catholic Knights of Columbus at Carnegie Hall on Columbus Day, asserted that,

President Woodrow Wilson regarded "hyphenated Americans" with suspicion, saying in his Pueblo speech: "Any man who carries a hyphen about with him carries a dagger that he is ready to plunge into the vitals of this Republic whenever he gets ready."

A vocal source of criticism of Roosevelt and Wilson's "anti-hyphen" ideology and particularly to their demands for "100 percent Americanism" came, quite understandably, from America's enormous number of White ethnic immigrants and their descendants. Criticism from these circles occasionally argued that "100 percent Americanism" really meant Anglophilia, as particularly demonstrated by demands for tolerating the English language only. In a letter published on July 16, 1916, in the Minneapolis Journal, Edward Goldbeck, a member of Minnesota's traditionally very large German-American community, sarcastically announced that his people would, "abandon the hyphen", as soon as English-Americans did so. Meanwhile, he argued, "Let the exodus of Anglo-Americans start at once! Let all those people go who think that America is a new England!"

Hyphenated American identities 

Some groups recommend dropping the hyphen because it implies to some people dual nationalism and the inability to be accepted as truly American. The Japanese American Citizens League is supportive of dropping the hyphen because the non-hyphenated form uses their ancestral origin as an adjective for "American".

By contrast, other groups have embraced the hyphen, arguing that the American identity is compatible with alternative identities and that the mixture of identities within the United States strengthens the nation rather than weakens it.

"European American", as opposed to White or Caucasian, has been coined in response to the increasing racial and ethnic diversity of the United States, as well as to this diversity moving more into the mainstream of the society in the latter half of the twentieth century.  The term distinguishes whites of European ancestry from those of other ancestries.  In 1977, it was proposed that the term "European American" replace "white" as a racial label in the U.S. census, although this was not done.  The term "European American" is not in common use in the United States among the general public or in the mass media, and the terms "white" or "white American" are commonly used instead.

Usage of the hyphen 

Modern style guides, such as AP Stylebook, recommend dropping the hyphen between the two names; some, including The Chicago Manual of Style (CMOS), recommend dropping the hyphen even for the adjective form.

American English 

Examples:
 Region, the continent or race: African American, Asian American, South Asian American, European American, Hispanic American, Middle Eastern American, Native American, Pacific Islander American, etc.
 Ethnicity or nationality: Arab American, Armenian American, Bangladeshi American, Chinese American, Colombian American, Danish American, Dutch Americans, English American, Ethiopian American, Filipino American, French American, German American, Greek American, Haitian American, Indian American, Iranian Americans, Irish American, Italian American, Japanese American, Jewish American, Korean American, Mexican American, Norwegian American, Pakistani American, Polish American, Russian American, Scottish American, Spanish American, Swedish American, Turkish American, Ukrainian American, Vietnamese American, etc.

The hyphen is occasionally but not consistently employed when the compound term is used as an adjective. Academic style guides (including APA, ASA, MLA, and Chicago Manual) do not use a hyphen in these compounds even when they are used as adjectives.

The linguistic construction functionally indicates ancestry, but also may connote a sense that these individuals straddle two worlds—one experience is specific to their unique ethnic identity, while the other is the broader multicultural amalgam that is Americana.

Relative to Latin America 

Latin America includes most of the Western Hemisphere south of the United States, including Mexico, Central America, South America, and (in some cases) the Caribbean. United States nationals with origins in Latin America are often referred to as Hispanic or Latino Americans, or by their specific country of origin, e.g., Mexican Americans, Puerto Ricans, and Cuban Americans.

See also  

 Americanization
 Cultural nationalism
 Demographics of the United States
 Diaspora studies
 Ethnic group
 Ethnic interest groups in the United States
 Ethnic nationalism
 Hyphenated ethnicity
 Melting pot
 Multiculturalism
 Nativism
 Political correctness
 Xenophobia in the United States

References

Further reading
 Bagby, Wesley M.  The Road to Normalcy: The Presidential Campaign and Election of 1920 (1962) pp 153–155 online
  on economic discrimination
 Burchell, R. A. "Did the Irish and German Voters Desert the Democrats in 1920? A Tentative Statistical Answer." Journal of American Studies 6.2 (1972): 153-164.
 Dorsey, Leroy G. We Are All Americans, Pure and Simple: Theodore Roosevelt and the Myth of Americanism (U of Alabama Press, 2007), online review
 
 
 
 
 Vought, Hans. , "Division and reunion: Woodrow Wilson, immigration, and the myth of American unity." Journal of American Ethnic History (1994) 13#3: 24-50. online

External links 

 The Hyphenated AmericanThe National Museum of American History

Anti-German sentiment in the United States
Anti-Irish sentiment
British-American history
Ethnic groups in the United States
Identity politics
Progressivism in the United States
United States home front during World War I